Mammadova is a feminine surname of Azerbaijani origin. The masculine surname counterpoint is Mammadov. People with the name include:
 Aysel Mammadova (born 1989), Azerbaijani singer
Diana Mammadova (born 1998), Azerbaijani footballer
Farida Mammadova (1936–2021), Azerbaijani historian
Gulchohra Mammadova (born 1953), Azerbaijani architect and academician
Gulnar Mammadova (born 1991), Azerbaijani chess player
Havva Mammadova (born 1958), Azerbaijani politician and historian
Kamilla Mammadova (born 1996), Azerbaijani footballer
Natalya Mammadova (born 1984), Ukrainian-born Azerbaijani volleyball player
Narmina Mammadova (born 1990), Azerbaijani footballer
Nazakat Mammadova (1944–1980), Azerbaijani singer
Shafiga Mammadova (born 1945), Azerbaijani actress
Shovkat Mammadova (1897–1981), Azerbaijani opera singer
Valeriya Mammadova (born 1984), Azerbaijani volleyball player
Zivar Mammadova (1902–1980), Azerbaijani sculptor

Azerbaijani-language surnames
Slavic-language female forms of surnames